Bucliona is a genus of sac spiders first described by Pierre L.G. Benoit in 1977.  it contains only three species: B. dubia, B. jucunda, and B. kirilli. It was synonymized with Clubiona in 1997, but was elevated back to genus in 2021. The type species was originally described under the name "Clubiona dubia".

See also
 Clubiona
 Liocranum
 List of Clubionidae species

References

Further reading

Clubionidae genera